Mauerick Frankera Ahanmisi (born July 17, 1991) is an American-born Filipino-Nigerian professional basketball player for the Converge FiberXers of the Philippine Basketball Association (PBA).

High school career
Ahanmisi spent a year at Stoneridge Prep in Simi Valley, California, but he graduated from Golden Valley High School in Santa Clarita, California in 2009.  As a senior, he averaged 20.2 points per game and finished his career as all-time leading scorer and three-point shooter at GVHS. He played AAU basketball at Branch West Basketball Academy under the tutelage of Bob Gottlieb.  In 2010, he signed a letter of intent to play for the University of Minnesota.

College career
Ahanmisi played college basketball at University of Minnesota, an NCAA Division I school, from 2010–2014, mostly in a reserve role. He's a known sparkplug off the bench and usually leads the team's second unit. He helped the Golden Gophers win the National Invitational Tournament title in 2014. The Gophers are coached by Richard Pitino, son of coach Rick Pitino of Louisville.

In his four years in Minnesota, he averaged 2.8 points, 1 rebound, and 38% field goal average.

Professional career

Café France Bakers (PBA D-League)
In 2014, Ahanmisi decided to leave the United States after college and take his basketball career with him in the Philippines, by playing for the Cafe France Bakers in the PBA Developmental League. In his career debut in the Philippines, he made his presence felt right away, scoring 10 points in an 18–0 run in the first quarter that keyed in a win for Cafe France.
In the 2015 PBA D-League Foundation Cup eliminations, he led the team in scoring, averaging 13.9 points per game, while also contributing 6.8 rebounds and 4.0 assists per outing.  He helped guide Café France to its first ever PBA-D-League championship by ruling the Foundation Cup.

Rain or Shine Elasto Painters
According to the list released by the PBA on August 10, 2015, Ahanmisi was one of the sixteen Fil-Foreigners who applied for the 2015 PBA draft. He was drafted as a 3rd overall pick by the Rain or Shine Elasto Painters in the 2015 PBA draft.  He signed a two-year maximum rookie deal with the Elasto Painters. In his first breakout game as a pro against Mahindra on October 25, 2015, he scored 11 of his 14 points in the fourth quarter alone, while leading the Elasto Painters to a 2–0 start in the 2015–16 All-Filipino Cup.

During the duration of the All-Filipino conference, he averaged 8.3 points, 4 rebounds, and 2.3 assists a game, while filling in the void of the injured Paul Lee for the majority of the tournament.

Alaska Aces / Converge FiberXers
On August 16, 2019, Ahanmisi was traded to Alaska Aces for Chris Exciminiano and 2019 first round pick.

On June 6, 2022, Ahanmisi signed with the Converge FiberXers, the new team that took over the defunct Alaska Aces franchise.

PBA career statistics

As of the end of 2022–23 season

Season-by-season averages

|-
| align=left | 
| align=left | Rain or Shine
| 54 || 21.5 || .412 || .350 || .748 || 3.9 || 2.7 || .6 || .1 || 8.7
|-
| align=left | 
| align=left | Rain or Shine
| 38 || 24.4 || .418 || .275 || .738 || 4.4 || 3.1 || 1.0 || .2 || 7.4
|-
| align=left | 
| align=left | Rain or Shine
| 39 || 29.5 || .406 || .340 || .619 || 4.9 || 3.6 || 1.4 || .3 || 10.9
|-
| align=left rowspan=2| 
| align=left | Rain or Shine
| rowspan=2|22 || rowspan=2|25.7 || rowspan=2|.390 || rowspan=2|.310 || rowspan=2|.705 || rowspan=2|4.9 || rowspan=2|2.5 || rowspan=2|1.2 || rowspan=2|.2 || rowspan=2|8.5
|-
| align=left | Alaska
|-
| align=left | 
| align=left | Alaska
| 9 || 22.8 || .421 || .348 || .700 || 4.7 || 2.7 || .7 || .0 || 7.8
|-
| align=left | 
| align=left | Alaska
| 23 || 29.5 || .384 || .326 || .609 || 5.5 || 3.4 || 1.2 || .1 || 8.4
|-
| align=left | 
| align=left | Converge
| 36 || 31.0 || .433 || .347 || .706 || 5.9 || 3.8 || 1.2 || .1 || 13.7
|-class=sortbottom
| colspan="2" align="center" | Career
| 221 || 26.3 || .412 || .331 || .690 || 4.8 ||	3.1 || 1.0 || .2 || 9.6

Personal life
Ahanmisi comes from a family of diverse ethnicities. His father, Victor Ahanmisi is a Nigerian, while his mother Marissa (née Frankera) is a Filipina, who hails from Alcala, Pangasinan. He has two siblings, Jerrick and Mylenne. Jerrick currently plays for the Magnolia Hotshots in PBA.

References

1991 births
Living people
21st-century African-American sportspeople
African-American basketball players
Alaska Aces (PBA) players
American men's basketball players
American sportspeople of Filipino descent
American sportspeople of Nigerian descent
Asian Games competitors for the Philippines
Basketball players at the 2018 Asian Games
Basketball players from Los Angeles
Citizens of the Philippines through descent
Converge FiberXers players
Filipino men's basketball players
Filipino people of Nigerian descent
Minnesota Golden Gophers men's basketball players
Philippines men's national basketball team players
Point guards
Rain or Shine Elasto Painters draft picks
Rain or Shine Elasto Painters players
Shooting guards
Sportspeople from Santa Clarita, California